Thomas Ritchie may refer to:

 Thomas Ritchie (judge) (1777–1852), lawyer, judge and political figure in Nova Scotia
 Thomas Ritchie (journalist) (1778–1854), American newspaper journalist, editor and publisher
 Thomas Ritchie (psychiatric survivor), founded the Scottish Union of Mental Patients